John Jelliff (July 30, 1813 – July 2, 1893) was a significant furniture designer and manufacturer, based in Newark, New Jersey during the second half of the 19th century. By the 1850s, John Jelliff & Co. had become the leading furniture manufacturer in New Jersey.

By 1843, J.Jelliff's was located at 301-303 Broad Street  (photo), and by 1876, John Jelliff & Co. was the largest furniture establishment in Newark, located at 794 & 796 Broad Street.

Furniture with the Jelliff & Co. (or J.J. & Co.) maker's mark are exceedingly scarce. Most pieces can only be attributed to the firm.

Biography 
Born in Norwalk, Connecticut. Son of Hezekiah Jelliff and Nancy Bennett. John Jelliff apprenticed to Alonzo W. Anderson, a cabinetmaker in New York City in 1828, and moved to New Jersey in the early 1820s. He first worked for Lemuel M. Crane of Newark, and took over the Crane business in 1838. Jelliff then partnered with Thomas L. Vantilburg through 1843. In 1854, Jelliff partnered with Henry H. Miller, who served as his foreman. By the late 1850s Jelliff's work reflected the Italian renaissance style; he later found inspiration in the designs of John Henry Belter. 

By 1874, the Jelliff factory had  of floor space, employed 45 men and did annual sales of $100,000 (equivalent to $ million in ), catering to the needs of the leading families in Newark. Jelliff retired in 1890. In spite of the industrialization of his time, Jelliff refused to produce machine-made furniture. The company produced rosewood, walnut and mahogany furniture with the occasional use of a fruitwood or maple as inlay.

The company was an integral part of Newark's manufacturing history. "Perhaps the history of no single firm has been more closely interwoven with the progress of Newark in wealth, culture and refinement than John Jelliff & Co."

Jelliff Avenue in Newark is named after John Jelliff.

A large collection of pencil sketches and drawings in Jelliff's hand survives, showing that he was the firm's chief designer. The drawings are held by the Newark Museum.

Furniture styles 
The firm produced furniture in several revival styles, including: Gothic revival (1825 – 1865), Louis XVI revival (1860-1890), and Renaissance Revival (1860-1885)

Museum collections 
One of the best-known undertakings of Jelliff & Miller is a parlor suite from the 1870s, consisting of a sofa, armchair and four side chairs, now in the Ballentine House, which adjoins the Newark Museum. Jelliff's crowning achievement in carved furniture is the bishop's throne, dating to about 1850, in Newark's St. Patrick's Roman Catholic Church. The throne is "one of the chief monuments to the Gothic revival style in America." Jelliff also designed the cover of the church's baptismal font.

Jelliff's work is also included in the permanent collections of numerous museums, including:
Metropolitan Museum of Art - 68.133.3
New Jersey Historical Society - 1989.42.1
Museum of Fine Arts in Boston - 1990.258
 Brooklyn Museum - 1994.18
Indianapolis Museum of Art at Newfields - 79.148
Museum of Arts and Sciences in Daytona Beach

References

Sources
 Antiques, The Magazine. June 1946
 Early Furniture Made in New Jersey, 1690-1870. Newark Museum, 1958
 Proceedings of the New Jersey Historical Society, October 1958
 Central New Jersey Chairmaking of the Nineteenth Century. William MacDonald, 1959
 Antiques: Volume 74 Issue 4, October 1958 
 Antiques, The Magazine. August 1972
 Crafts and Craftsmen of New Jersey. Walter Hamilton Van Hoesen, 1973
 Antiques, The Magazine. May 1986
 Antiques, The Magazine. April 1990
 American furniture of the 19th century. Eileen Dubrow, 2000
 Century of Revivals: Nineteenth-Century American Furniture. The Newark Museum Quarterly, Vol. 31, No. 2-3 Spring / Summer 1980

1813 births
1893 deaths
American furniture makers
People from Newark, New Jersey
People from Norwalk, Connecticut
American furniture designers
American designers
Furniture companies of the United States
Furniture designers